Amos Kirui (born 9 February 1998) is a Kenyan distance runner who competes in the 3000 metres steeplechase. He was the gold medallist at the 2016 IAAF World U20 Championships, extending his nation's grip on the event since 1988. Kirui was a silver medallist in the steeplechase at the 2014 Summer Youth Olympics and a bronze medallist at the 2014 African Youth Games. He shared in a junior team silver at the 2017 IAAF World Cross Country Championships.

Personal bests

References

External links
 Amos Kirui at OmRiyadat English
 

1998 births
Living people
Athletes (track and field) at the 2014 Summer Youth Olympics
Athletes (track and field) at the 2018 Commonwealth Games
Kenyan male cross country runners
Kenyan male steeplechase runners
Commonwealth Games medallists in athletics
Commonwealth Games bronze medallists for Kenya
Medallists at the 2018 Commonwealth Games